Adalbert von Blanc (11 July 1907 – 7 November 1976) was a German naval officer during World War II and later an admiral in the West German Navy. During World War II he was awarded the Knight's Cross of the Iron Cross and served as 1st Officer on the auxiliary cruiser Orion.

Blanc was born in Wilhelmshaven. He joined Weimar Germany Weimar German Navy in 1926 and was trained on the "Niobe".

After World War II Blanc joined the British controlled German Mine Sweeping Administration on 15 August 1945. Blanc held command of the 1. Minenräum-Division (1st mine sweeping division) in Kiel. When the administration was disbanded on 31 December 1947, Blanc transferred to the follow organization called Minenräumverband Cuxhaven and became its chief.

On 18 December 1950 the students Georg von Hatzfeld and René Ledesdorff from Heidelberg occupied the isle of Helgoland. The two were joined by Prince Hubertus zu Loewenstein-Wertheim-Freudenberg on 29 December 1950. The number of occupants had grown to 13 when Blanc was ordered by the British authorities to send two boats for the evacuation of Helgoland. Blanc refused to obey the order, even when he came under severe pressure and suspended from his command post. A legal proceeding against Blanc was initiated on 3 January 1951. The British court ruled that the order was not among his contractual obligations and he was re-instituted in his position as chief of the Minenräumverband Cuxhaven.

Awards
 Iron Cross (1939) 2nd Class (15 September 1940) & 1st Class (17 October 1940)
 Wehrmacht Long Service Award 4th Class (2 October 1936) & 3rd Class (1 April 1938)
 Sudetenland Medal (20 December 1939)
 Auxiliary Cruiser Badge (23 August 1941)
 German Cross in Gold on 11 September 1942 as Korvettenkapitän in the 2. Sicherungs-Division
 Minesweeper War Badge (25 March 1943)
 Knight's Cross of the Iron Cross with Oak Leaves
 Knight's Cross on 27 November 1944 as Fregattenkapitän and leader of the 9. Sicherungs-Division
 (866th) Oak Leaves on 10 May 1945 as Fregattenkapitän and leader of the 9. Marine-Sicherungs-Division
 Grand Cross of the Order of Merit of the Federal Republic of Germany in 1964

Footnotes

References

Citations

Bibliography

1907 births
1976 deaths
People from Wilhelmshaven
People from the Province of Hanover
Flotilla admirals of the German Navy
Reichsmarine personnel
Kriegsmarine personnel of World War II
Recipients of the Gold German Cross
Recipients of the Knight's Cross of the Iron Cross with Oak Leaves
Commanders Crosses of the Order of Merit of the Federal Republic of Germany
German prisoners of war in World War II held by the United Kingdom
Military personnel from Lower Saxony